S. Simon Wong is a professor in the Stanford Department of Electrical Engineering. He is affiliated faculty in the Stanford Non-Volatile Memory Technology Research Initiative (NMTRI), System X Alliance, and Bio-X.

Education
S. Simon Wong received two bachelor's degrees from the University of Minnesota: electrical engineering and mechanical engineering. He completed a M.S. and Ph.D. in electrical engineering from the University of California, Berkeley.

Academic career and research
Wong joined the faculty of Stanford Department of Electrical Engineering in 1988.

He studies the fabrication and design of high-performance integrated circuits. His work focuses on understanding and overcoming the limitations of circuit performance imposed by device, interconnect, and on-chip components.

Awards and honors
 Fellow, IEEE

References

External links
 Stanford profile, S. Simon Wong
 Complete list of published work
 Academic tree, S. Simon Wong
NMTRI website

Year of birth missing (living people)
Living people
American electrical engineers
Electrical engineering academics
Fellow Members of the IEEE
Stanford University alumni
Stanford University Department of Electrical Engineering faculty
Stanford University faculty
Stanford University School of Engineering faculty
University of Minnesota College of Science and Engineering alumni